Photinia is a genus of about 30 species of small trees and large shrubs, but the taxonomy has recently varied greatly, with the genera Heteromeles, Stranvaesia and Aronia sometimes included in Photinia.

They are a part of the rose family (Rosaceae) and related to the apple. The botanical genus name derives from the Greek word photeinos for shiny and refers to the often glossy leaves. Most species are evergreen, but deciduous species also occur. The small apple-shaped fruit has a size of 4 to 12 mm and forms in large quantities. They ripen in the fall and often remain hanging on the bush until well into the winter. The fruits are used as food by birds, which excrete the seeds with their droppings and thereby distribute the plant.

The natural range of these species is restricted to warm temperate Asia, from the Himalaya east to Japan and south to India and Thailand. They have, however, been widely cultivated throughout the world as ornamentals for their white flowers and red fruits.

The scientific name Photinia is also widely used as the common name. Another name sometimes used is "Christmas berry", but this name is a source of confusion, since it is commonly applied to plants in several genera including Heteromeles, Lycium, Schinus, and Ruscus. The name "photinia" also continues to be used for several species of small trees in the mountains of Mexico and Central America which had formerly been included in the genus Photinia.

Description

Photinias typically grow from 4–15 m tall, with a usually irregular crown of angular branches; the branches are often (not always) thorny. The leaves are alternate, entire or finely toothed, varying between species from 3–15 cm in length and 1.5–5 cm wide; the majority of species are evergreen but several are deciduous. The flowers are produced in early summer in dense terminal corymbs; each flower is 5–10 mm diameter, with five rounded white petals; they have a mild, hawthorn-like scent. The fruit is a small pome, 4–12 mm across, bright red and berry-like, produced large quantities, maturing in the fall and often persisting well into the winter. The fruit are consumed by birds, including thrushes, waxwings and starlings; the seeds are dispersed in their droppings. Photinia species are sometimes used as food plants by the larvae of some Lepidoptera species including common emerald, feathered thorn and setaceous Hebrew character. Photinias are subject to leaf blight. https://homeguides.sfgate.com/photinia-blight-43033.html.

Taxonomy
Some botanists also include the closely related North American species Heteromeles arbutifolia in Photinia — as Photinia arbutifolia. The genus Stranvaesia is so similar in morphology to Photinia that its species have sometimes been included within it, but recent molecular data indicate that the two genera are not closely related. The genus Aronia has been included in Photinia in some classifications, but recent molecular data confirm that these genera are not closely related. Other close relatives include the firethorns (Pyracantha), cotoneasters (Cotoneaster) and hawthorns (Crataegus).

A number of species have been moved to the separate genus Stranvaesia including P. amphidoxa, P. davidiana, P. nussia, and P. tomentosa.

Uses

Photinias are very popular ornamental shrubs, grown for their fruit and foliage. Numerous hybrids and cultivars are available; several of the cultivars are selected for their strikingly bright red young leaves in spring and summer. The most widely planted are:

Photinia × fraseri (P. glabra × P. serratifolia) - red tip photinia, Christmas berry

Photinia × fraseri 'Red Robin' - probably the most widely planted of all, this cultivar has gained the Royal Horticultural Society's Award of Garden Merit
Photinia × fraseri 'Little Red Robin', a plant similar to 'Red Robin', but dwarf in stature with an ultimate height/spread of around 2–3 ft
Photinia × fraseri 'Camilvy'
Photinia × fraseri 'Curly Fantasy'
Photinia × fraseri 'Super Hedger' - a newer hybrid with strong upright growth
Photinia × fraseri 'Pink Marble' also known as 'Cassini', a new cultivar with rose-pink tinted new growth and a creamy-white variegated margin on the leaves
Photinia × fraseri 'Robusta'

Photinia 'Redstart' (Stranvaesia davidiana × P. × fraseri)
Photinia 'Palette' (parentage unknown)
Photinia davidiana 'Fructu Luteo' (fruit yellow)
Photinia davidiana 'Prostrata' (a low-growing form)

Toxicity
Some varieties of Photinia are toxic due to the presence of cyanogenic glycosides in the vacuoles of foliage and fruit cells. When the leaves are chewed these compounds are released and are rapidly converted to hydrogen cyanide (HCN) which blocks cellular respiration. The amount of HCN produced varies considerably between taxa, and is in general greatest in young leaves. Ruminants are particularly affected by cyanogenic glycosides because the first stage of their digestive system (the rumen) provides better conditions for liberating HCN than the stomachs of monogastric vertebrates.

Species list
The following 32 species are accepted by Plants of the World Online 

 Photinia anlungensis 
 Photinia arbutifolia 
 Photinia berberidifolia 
 Photinia chihsiniana 
 Photinia chingiana 
 Photinia chingshuiensis 
 Photinia crassifolia 
 Photinia cucphuongensis 
 Photinia davidiana 
 Photinia fokienensis 
 Photinia × fraseri 
 Photinia glabra 
 Photinia griffithii 
 Photinia hirsuta 
 Photinia impressivena 
 Photinia integrifolia 
 Photinia lanuginosa 
 Photinia lasiogyna 
 Photinia lindleyana 
 Photinia lochengensis 
 Photinia loriformis 
 Photinia megaphylla 
 Photinia prionophylla 
 Photinia prunifolia 
 Photinia pustulata 
 Photinia serratifolia 
 Photinia sorbifolia 
 Photinia stenophylla 
 Photinia taishunensis 
 Photinia tushanensis 
 Photinia undulata 
 Photinia wrightiana 
 Photinia zhejiangensis

References

External links
Flora of China: Stranvaesia

 
Garden plants
Rosaceae genera
Shrubs